This is a list of episodes of the television series Borgen, a Danish political drama created by Adam Price with co-writers Jeppe Gjervig Gram and Tobias Lindholm and produced by DR, the Danish public broadcaster. Borgen is set in Copenhagen. Politician Birgitte Nyborg becomes the first female Prime Minister of Denmark against all the odds. Four series have been made, three of which consist of ten episodes each, and the fourth one eight. 

The programme has also been broadcast in various countries outside Denmark, including the United Kingdom, the United States, Italy, Spain, the Netherlands, Belgium, Portugal and Australia.
In the UK, the first season was aired on BBC Four during the first few weeks of 2012, and the second season was aired in January 2013.<ref>[https://www.theguardian.com/tv-and-radio/2012/feb/05/lilyhammer-series-borgen-bbc4-zandt The Guardian, 5 February 2012: Lilyhammer series could provide just the tonic for bereft "Borgen" fans] Relinked 2013-12-14</ref> In the US, Link TV aired the first season in the fall of 2011 and the second in the summer of 2012.

Each episode of Borgen'' begins with an epigraph related to that episode's theme; these epigraphs are listed along with the episode summaries below.

Series overview

Episodes

Series 1 (2010)

Series 2 (2011)

Series 3 (2013)

Series 4 (2022) Borgen – Power & Glory

References

Borgen